is a Japanese football player.

Career
After attending Ryutsu Keizai University football club, Tachibana joined Yokohama FC in 2018. On 3 August 2019, he was loaned out to Brazilian club Tombense. However, he returned soon afterward on 16 August due to a knee injury. On 28 February 2020, Tachibana moved to Australian club Preston Lions FC. Among other things, he scored four goals in a game Heidelberg Eagles SC in the FFA Cup.

Club statistics
Updated to 29 August 2018.

References

External links

Profile at J. League
Profile at Yokohama FC

1995 births
Living people
Association football people from Kanagawa Prefecture
Japanese footballers
Japanese expatriate footballers
J2 League players
J3 League players
Yokohama FC players
Tombense Futebol Clube players
Preston Lions FC players
SC Sagamihara players
Association football forwards
Japanese expatriate sportspeople in Brazil
Japanese expatriate sportspeople in Australia
Japanese expatriate sportspeople in South Korea
Expatriate footballers in Brazil
Expatriate soccer players in Australia
Expatriate footballers in South Korea